The Morane-Saulnier AI (also Type AI) was a French parasol-wing fighter aircraft produced by Morane-Saulnier during World War I.

Development and design
The AI was developed as a refinement of the Morane-Saulnier Type N concept, and was intended to replace the Nieuport 17 and SPAD VII in French service, in competition with the SPAD XIII, which it was built as a back-up for. Its Gnome Monosoupape 9N 160 CV rotary engine was mounted in a circular open-front cowling. The strut braced parasol wing was swept back. The spars and ribs of the circular section fuselage were wood, wire-braced and covered in fabric, and faired out with wood stringers. The production aircraft were given service designations based on whether they had 1 Vickers machine gun (designated MoS 27) or 2 Vickers guns (designated MoS 29).

Operational history

A number of escadrilles were created to operate the AI, but by mid-May 1918, most of the aircraft were replaced by the SPAD XIII. After structural problems had been resolved, the aircraft were then relegated to use as advanced trainers, with new purpose built examples being designated MoS 30. Many were used post-war after having been surplussed off, as aerobatic aircraft, including one which was flown by Charles Nungesser.

Fifty-one MoS 30s were purchased by the American Expeditionary Force as pursuit trainers.

Variants
MoS 27
Fighter variant with one 0.303in (7.7mm) Vickers machine gun and powered by a Gnome Monosoupape 9NI rotary engine.
MoS 29
Fighter variant with two 0.303in (7.7mm) Vickers machine guns and powered by a Gnome Monosoupape 9NI rotary engine.
MoS 30
Unarmed single seat advanced trainer with either a 89kW (120hp) le Rhone 9Jb or a 101kW (135hp) le Rhone 9Jby rotary engine.
MoS 30bis
Variant of the MoS 30 with a de-rated le Rhone 9Jby engine 67kW (90hp).

Operators

In addition to military operators, the Morane-Saulnier AI was popular with French aerobatic pilots and a number carried civil registrations.

Belgian Air Force

Czechoslovakian Air Force - operated a single MoS.30.

French Air Force
Escadrille MS 156
Escadrille MS 158
Escadrille MS 161
 
Imperial Japanese Army Air Service - Evaluated a single MoS.30 in 1922.

Soviet Air Force - Four aircraft, used for tests and trials.

Swiss Air Force operated at least one aircraft.

American Expeditionary Force - operated 51 MoS.30 trainers.

Survivors

Three AIs are flown from La Ferté-Alais.

The Fantasy of Flight collection in Polk City, Florida has an AI that was sold to the United States Army Air Service in 1918 for testing at McCook Field in Ohio until being sold off for private use. It later joined the Tallmantz Collection which was then acquired by Fantasy of Flight in 1985 and restored in the late 1980s.

Another AI, formerly flown by Charles Nungesser is in the Old Rhinebeck Aerodrome collection, and was flown in the weekend airshows there.

Specifications (MoS 27 C.1, 150 hp Monosoupape)

References

Notes

Bibliography
 Angelucci, Enzo. The Rand McNally Encyclopedia of Military Aircraft, 1914-1980. San Diego, California: The Military Press, 1983. .
 Bruce, J.M. War Planes of the First World War: Volume Five Fighters. London: Macdonald, 1972. .

 
 Donald, David, ed. The Encyclopedia of World Aircraft. Ottawa, Canada: Prospero Books, 1997. p. 659. .
 Holmes, Tony. Jane's Vintage Aircraft Recognition Guide. London: Harper Collins, 2005. p. 36. .

 Lamberton, W.M. Fighter Aircraft of the 1914-1918 War. Herts, UK: Harleyford Publications Ltd., 1960, pp. 84–85.

Further reading

External links

 Old Rhinebeck Aerodrome's page on their original Morane-Saulnier AI (misdesignated "A-1", archived June 2014)
 Cole Palen flying Old Rhinebeck's Morane AI in early August 1990

1910s French fighter aircraft
AI
1910s French military trainer aircraft
Single-engined tractor aircraft
Parasol-wing aircraft
Aircraft first flown in 1917
Rotary-engined aircraft